This is an annual rugby union competition played by teams from Sydney, Australia based boys high schools who are members of the AAGPS.

History
The official rugby union competition commenced in 1892. In 2009 after 103 years playing in the 1st XV competition Sydney Boys High School decided to withdraw itself from AAGPS Rugby. After a two-year absence High returned in 2011 with their 1st XV in the 2nd XV competition. In 2012 the Armidale School's 1st XV was admitted into the 2nd XV competition while High were placed in the inaugural 3rd XV competition. Sydney Grammar School decided not to participate in the 2013 1st XV competition reducing the number of schools competing in the 1st XV to 6. It was decided that both the 1st XV and 2nd XV competitions would only include Newington, Shore, Riverview, St Josephs, Kings and Scots. The 3rd XVs of all these schools joined the 1st XVs of Armidale, Grammar and High in a nine-team 3rd XV competition. With the 1st XV and 2nd XV only having six teams, it was also decided that the competition format should change from a single round-robin to a double round-robin. However it has since changed back to a single round-robin competition. The 3rd XV competition remained a single round-robin.
 1st Grade School Challenge Trophy Presented by the President and Vice Presidents of The New South Wales Rugby Football Union first award in 1986 replacing an earlier shield
 2nd Grade W.S.Corr Shield. The Shield also has AAGPS 2nd Grade Football engraved on it. It was first presented in 1913.

Results

1892 to 1999

Year 2000 onwards

See also
 Athletic Association of the Great Public Schools of New South Wales
 AAGPS (NSW) Basketball
 AAGPS (NSW) Soccer
 Head of the River (New South Wales)
 AAGPS (NSW) Athletics

References

 GPS Results Archive

External links
 GPS website

Athletic Association of the Great Public Schools of New South Wales
Sport in New South Wales
Private schools in New South Wales
Recurring sporting events established in 1893
Sports competitions in Sydney